Faiza Aissahine  (born 20 July 1993) is a judoka who competes internationally for Algeria. She is a gold medalist at the African games.

Achievements
Aissahine won the African Open in Yaounde in 2018 U52kg. She won a gold medal at the African Games in Rabat in 2019 and also the African Championship 2022.

Aissahine has won two gold medals in continental championships, two in continental open. She has won silver at an international tournament and has also won 5 bronze in total.

She lost her bronze medal match in the women's 52 kg event at the 2022 Mediterranean Games held in Oran, Algeria.

References

External links
 
 

Living people
1993 births
Algerian female judoka
African Games medalists in judo
African Games gold medalists for Algeria
Competitors at the 2019 African Games
Competitors at the 2022 Mediterranean Games
Mediterranean Games competitors for Algeria
20th-century Algerian women
21st-century Algerian women